Subhash Patel (born 25 April 1978) is an Indian politician and a member of the Bharatiya Janata Party. He served as Member of parliament, Lok Sabha from the Khargone (Lok Sabha constituency).

References

Living people
India MPs 2014–2019
Lok Sabha members from Madhya Pradesh
Bharatiya Janata Party politicians from Madhya Pradesh
1978 births
People from Khargone district